The Ultimatum: Marry or Move On is a dating reality television series created by Chris Coelen and produced by Kinetic Content that premiered on Netflix on April 6, 2022. The show is hosted by Nick and Vanessa Lachey.

On March 24, 2022, Netflix renewed The Ultimatum for a second season, ahead of its premiere. Season 2 will feature an all-queer, predominantly female cast.

Format 
The Ultimatum is a self-proclaimed social experiment that wants to see how many couples will get married when presented with ultimatums. The show features six couples on the verge of marriage. Each pair has eight weeks to decide whether they want to get married or split forever. Couples will later be split up as they choose new partners from the rest of the group, and then move in with them for three weeks.

Contestants

Season summary

Season 1 (2022)

Episodes

Production

Filming
While never explicitly stated, season one of the series was filmed in Austin, Texas, in various locations. The first week the contestants spent dating each other was filmed at the Marriott Downtown Hotel in the city, while the rest of the series was filmed at the Aloft Austin Downtown Hotel.

Filming started in May 2021 and lasted for eight weeks with the reunion being filmed later.

Release
A trailer was in the reunion episode of season two of Love Is Blind on March 4, 2022. It was advertised as "the next great social experiment" with the same creator as Love Is Blind.

The first season consisting of eight episodes released to Netflix on April 6, 2022, and later released the final episode along with a reunion special on April 13, a week later.

Reception

Viewership
The series reached number one on Netflix in television shows in the United States on April 10, 2022.

The Ultimatum Season One spent four weeks in the Netlfix Global Top Ten, with 43,710,000 hours watched during its first week of release, 58,470,000 during week two, 29,010,000 during week three, and 13,140,000 during week four.

With a total of 144,330,000 hours watched within its first four weeks of release, The Ultimatum Season One ranked second, after only Love is Blind, as the most watched ongoing nonscripted series on Netflix in 2022, based on a tally of all hours viewed across all programs while in the Netflix Global Top Ten.

Critical Response 
Daniel D'Addario of Variety writes "Love is Blind and The Ultimatum are the new standard-bearers for romantic reality TV." D'Addario states The Ultimatum "inverts Love is Blind's formula to great success...(creator) Coelen's series occupy a more unsettled place, one that uses the tools of reality (big organizing ideas, people attuned to the dramatic) to create stagings that look like our world."

Jenny Singer from Glamour writes "The Ultimatum on Netflix is even better than Love Is Blind. Yes, really." Singer continues "The Ultimatum feels like an actual attempt at partnership—love, sex, intimacy, friendship, caring for each other’s dogs. The ending is insane, and so is the beginning, and the middle. That just makes it, oddly, realistic."

Alexandra Whittington at Collider says "The Ultimatum: Marry Or Move On is Netflix's wildest reality series yet...If you like reality dating shows then you are going to love The Ultimatum: Marry Or Move On."

Grant Rindner of GQ stated "critical reception has been mixed." Sarah Manavis of New Statesman was highly critical of the show, writing, "The awfulness of marriage shows is on full display here... The premise is shoddy and unclear, especially in comparison to other dating programmes." Sophia June of Nylon wrote no one from the series should get married based on the premise and "the manipulation techniques". Morgan Smith of Highsnobiety called it the "messiest reality dating show we hate to love" and stated he loved it.

References

External links
 
 

2020s American reality television series
American dating and relationship reality television series
2022 American television series debuts
English-language Netflix original programming
Television series about marriage
Television shows filmed in Texas